Aralica is a Serbian and Croatian surname. It may refer to:

Ante Aralica (born 1996), Croatian footballer
Ivan Aralica (born 1930), Yugoslav and Croatian novelist and essayist
Stojan Aralica (1883–1980), Yugoslav and Serbian painter and academic

References 

Croatian surnames
Serbian surnames